Phoebe Ephron (née Wolkind; January 26, 1914 – October 13, 1971) was an American playwright and screenwriter, who often worked with Henry Ephron, her husband, whom she wed in 1934.

Ephron was born in New York City to Louis and Kate (née Lautkin) Wolkind, a dress manufacturer. Her family is Jewish.

Ephron was active as a writer from the early 1940s through the early 1960s. Her four daughters – Nora Ephron, Delia Ephron, Hallie Ephron and Amy Ephron – all became writers, like their parents.

Ephron was nominated for an Oscar for Best Writing, Screenplay Based on Material from Another Medium, along with writing partners Richard L. Breen and husband Henry Ephron, for their work on Captain Newman, M.D. (1963).

She died in 1971, aged 57, in her native New York City.

Notable works (films unless otherwise noted)
Three Is a Family (1944) with Charlie Ruggles
Bride by Mistake (1944) with Laraine Day and Edgar Buchanan
The Jackpot (1950) with James Stewart
Belles on Their Toes (1952); sequel to Cheaper by the Dozen with Myrna Loy and Debra Paget
What Price Glory (1952);screenplay
Carousel (1956)
Desk Set (1957) with Spencer Tracy and Katharine Hepburn
Take Her, She's Mine (1961); Broadway play, later made into a film
There's No Business Like Show Business (1954) with Marilyn Monroe
Captain Newman, M.D. (1963) with Gregory Peck and Tony Curtis

References

External links

1914 births
1971 deaths
Screenwriters from New York (state)
Jewish American dramatists and playwrights
Writers from New York City
American women dramatists and playwrights
20th-century American dramatists and playwrights
20th-century American women writers
Ephron family
American women screenwriters
20th-century American screenwriters
20th-century American Jews